Valeria Bertuccelli (born 1969, 30 November) is an Argentine film and television actress.

Born in San Nicolás de los Arroyos, Buenos Aires Province, Argentina she began her career in experimental theatre, and later worked in the San Martín and Cervantes theatres. She was first cast in the cinema of Argentina by director Mariano Galperin, and received a Silver Condor Award for her role in Daniel Barone's Alma mía (2000). She won another Silver Condor for her leading role in Diego Lerman's Mientras tanto, in 2007.

Her husband, Vicentico, is co-founder and lead vocalist of the Argentine rock group Los Fabulosos Cadillacs. They have two sons together, Florián and Vicente.

Filmography
 1000 Boomerangs (1995)
 Alma mía (1999)
 Silvia Prieto (1999) a.k.a. Silvia Prieto
 Los Guantes mágicos (2003) a.k.a. The Magic Gloves
 Extraño (2003) a.k.a. Strange
 Boca de fresa (2003)
 Próxima salida (2004)
 Luna de Avellaneda (2004) a.k.a. Moon of Avellaneda
 Hermanas (2005)
 Mientras tanto (2006)
 La Antena (2007) a.k.a. The Aerial
 Hotel Tívoli (2007)
 XXY (2007)
 Lluvia (2008)
 Un novio para mi mujer (2008)
 Widows (2011)
 Vino para robar (2013)
 The Queen of Fear (2018)

Television
 "Verdad consecuencia" (1996)
 "Carola Casini" (1997)
 "Gasoleros" (1998)
 "Tiempofinal" (2000) a.k.a. "Final Minute"
 "Cuatro amigas" (2001) (Mini TV series) a.k.a. "Four Friends"
 "Máximo corazón" (2002) a.k.a. "Máximo in My Heart"
 "Mujeres asesinas" (2005)
 "Vientos de agua" (2006)

References

External links
 

1969 births
Living people
Argentine film actresses
Argentine people of Italian descent
People from San Nicolás de los Arroyos